Clearview is a neighborhood in Southwest Philadelphia. It is located from South 78th Street to South 84th Street, east of Cobbs Creek to Lindbergh Boulevard.

Education
Free Library of Philadelphia operates the Eastwick Branch, which serves Clearview and other subdivisions, at 2581 Island Avenue.

References

Neighborhoods in Philadelphia
Southwest Philadelphia